Friendly may refer to:

Places
 Friendly, West Yorkshire, a settlement in Calderdale, West Yorkshire, England
 Friendly, Maryland, an unincorporated community in the United States
 Friendly, Eugene, Oregon, a neighborhood in the United States	
 Friendly, West Virginia, a town in the United States
 Friendly Islands or Tonga

Other uses
 Friendly (surname)
 Friendly (musician), Australian-born musician
 Friendly (sport) or exhibition game, a game of association football or bandy that has no consequence in a wider competition
 Friendly's, an American restaurant chain
 Friendly Center, a shopping mall in Greensboro, North Carolina, United States
 Friendly Hall, a building on the University of Oregon campus
 Friendly High School, a public high school in Fort Washington, Maryland, United States
 Friendly number, in mathematics, shares a property concerning its divisors
 Friendly TV, a British TV station from 2003 to 2010

See also
 Friend (disambiguation)
 Friendly Hills (disambiguation)
 Friendly View, West Virginia, an incorporated community in the United States